Belfry may refer to:

In architecture 
 Belfry (architecture), a structure enclosing bells
 Bell tower
 Bell tower (wat), a Thai architectural structure
 Belfry, a type of medieval siege tower
 Belfries of Belgium and France, a UNESCO World Heritage Site in historic Flanders

Proper names 
 Belfry, Montana, a town in the United States
 Belfry Mountain, a summit in New York
 Belfry, Pennsylvania, a neighborhood of Whitpain Township, Montgomery County, Pennsylvania
 The Belfry, an English golf club
 The Belfry (Germantown Academy), a theatrical group
 The Belfry (shopping centre), Redhill, Surrey, England
 Belfry, a play by Billy Roche, third part of The Wexford Trilogy

See also 

 Bats in the belfry (disambiguation)